Khánh Hưng is a  commune in the Trần Văn Thời District of Cà Mau Province, Vietnam. As of 2007 the commune had a population of 18,874 and covers an area of 63.37 square kilometers.

The commune has 9 villages. Marine transportation is prevalent in the area. Industry is based around fishing, notably crabs, and blue shrimp.

Communes of Cà Mau province
Populated places in Cà Mau province